Evander Holyfield vs. James Tillis was a professional boxing match contested on July 16, 1988. The fight is notable for being Holyfield's first in the heavyweight division.

Background
Evander Holyfield had previously defeated Carlos De León to add the WBC cruiserweight title to the WBA and IBF versions already in his possession and become the first undisputed champion in the division's history. After the victory, Holyfield announced his attentions to move up to heavyweight and veteran fighter and former contender James Tillis was eventually named his first opponent. Holyfield was expected to be a future challenger to then-undisputed heavyweight champion Mike Tyson, whom Tillis had fought two years prior to his fight with Holyfield. Though Tillis would lose, he had an impressive showing against Tyson, being the first person to go the distance with him and ending Tyson's 19-fight knockout streak. Though he was no longer a contender, Tillis' experience against several top heavyweights led to Holyfield's promoter Dan Duva selecting him as Holyfield's fist heavyweight opponent. 
Tillis had formally been a top contender in the heavyweight division, starting his career with a 20–0 record and facing Mike Weaver in 1981 for the WBA heavyweight title, though he would lose a 15-round unanimous decision. Since then, Tillis' career had been veered largely into journeyman status, facing and losing to several top heavyweights including future and former heavyweight like champions Tyson Tim Witherspoon and Frank Bruno. Though Tillis was considered an underdog against Holyfield, he remained confident that he could earn an upset victory and gain a lucrative rematch against Tyson.

The fight
Holyfield would have little trouble with Tillis, earning a relatively easy referee technical knockout victory. There was a brief controversy at the end of round two as Holyfield and Tillis traded punches well after the bell rang. Holyfield's trainer Lou Duva got on the ring apron and restrained Tillis against the ropes which incited Williford who ran across the ring and shoved Duva before referee Richard Steele separated the two trainers. In round five Holyfield would hurt Tillis with several power punches in the final minute of the round. Tillis, with his back against the ropes, would barely make it out of the round as Holyfield landed a flurry of punches in the closing seconds. A clearly dazed Tillis returned to his corner where referee Steele called for the ringside doctor, whom advised Tillis to not continue, giving Holyfield the victory by referee technical knockout .

Fight card

References

1988 in boxing
Boxing in Nevada
Boxing on Showtime
Tillis
April 1988 sports events in the United States